The 1997 WNBA Championship was the championship game of the 1997 WNBA season, and the conclusion of the season's playoffs. The Houston Comets, top-seeded team of the league, defeated the New York Liberty, second-seeded team, 65-51 to win the league's inaugural championship.

The Comets' 18–10 record gave them home court advantage over New York (17–11).

For the playoffs, the top four teams overall in the league were seeded one to four. Top seed Houston played the four seed Charlotte and the two seed New York played number three Phoenix.

Road to the finals

Regular season series
The Liberty won 3 of the 4 games in the regular season series:

Game summary
Time listed below is Eastern Daylight Time.

The Houston Comets became the first WNBA champions, riding the unstoppable Cynthia Cooper and a suffocating defense to a 65–51 victory over the New York Liberty.

Cooper, the fledgling league's leading scorer who was named Most Valuable Player earlier in the week, scored 14 of her 25 points in the pivotal second half, when the Comets had a 10–0 burst and held the Liberty scoreless for nearly 6½ minutes. Tina Thompson added 18 points for the Comets, who turned Houston into "Clutch City" again. The city adopted that nickname during the two-year championship reign of the NBA's Houston Rockets.

Cooper also was named Finals MVP as the sellout crowd of 16,285 saw the Comets come up with their best defensive effort of the season.

Kym Hampton had 13 points and 13 rebounds and Vickie Johnson added 12 points for the Liberty, who picked a bad time for one of their worst offensive displays. A meaningless basket with three seconds remaining by Rebecca Lobo—who was limited to nine points—allowed New York to avoid its lowest point total of the season.

Houston, which edged New York for the Eastern Conference title and knocked off Charlotte in the semifinals, finished the regular season 18–10. The Liberty, who advanced with a semifinal win at Phoenix, were 17–11.

Awards
1997 WNBA Champion: Houston Comets	
Finals MVP: Cynthia Cooper

Rosters

{| class="toccolours" style="font-size: 95%; width: 100%;"
|-
! colspan="2" style="background-color: #B22222; color: #D3D3D3; text-align: center;" | 1997 Houston Comets Finals roster
|- style="background-color: #D3D3D3;color: #FFFFFF; text-align: center;"
! Players !! Coaches
|-
| valign="top" |
{| class="sortable" style="background:transparent; margin:0px; width:100%;"
! Pos. !! # !! Nat. !! Name !! Height !! Weight !!class="unsortable"| !! From
|-

{| class="toccolours" style="font-size: 95%; width: 100%;"
|-
! colspan="2" style="background-color: #0047AB; color: #FFFFFF; text-align: center;" | 1997 New York Liberty Finals roster
|- style="background-color: #66CDAA;color: #FF4500; text-align: center;"
! Players !! Coaches
|-
| valign="top" |
{| class="sortable" style="background:transparent; margin:0px; width:100%;"
! Pos. !! # !! Nat. !! Name !! Height !! Weight !!class="unsortable"| !! From
|-

References

Finals
Houston Comets
New York Liberty
WNBA Championship
WNBA Championship
Women's National Basketball Association Finals
WNBA Championship
Basketball competitions in Houston
1997 in Houston
Basketball competitions in New York City